George Walpole Leake (3 December 1825 – 3 October 1895) was a Western Australian barrister and magistrate and nephew of George Leake (1786–1849). For short periods of time he was also Attorney-General of Western Australia.

Leake held the following positions in Western Australia: Acting Crown Solicitor, 1857–8, confirmed February 1860; Acting Police Magistrate, Perth, from 1863 to 1866; Public Prosecutor, 1873 to 1874; Q.C. and Crown Solicitor, 1875; Acting Attorney-General and a member of the Executive and Legislative Councils, 1879 to 1880, and for a short time in 1883; Acting Chief Justice, 1879–80 and 1888; Police Magistrate, Perth, 1881; Acting Government Resident, Geraldton, 1886; Acting Puisne Judge, 1887 and 1889–90. In December 1890 Leake was nominated to the new Western Australian Legislative Council, having resigned his position as police magistrate.

Personal life

Leake arrived in the Swan River Colony aged 7 on 27 January 1833, on board . He travelled with his mother; his father having arrived in the colony some years previously. He did not stay long in Australia, being sent back to England after a few years to be schooled at King's College in London. Returning to the colony briefly after this, he then moved to Adelaide to study law.

He married Rose Ellen Gliddon in September 1850. Among their children were George Leake (1856–1902), who became Premier of Western Australia. Rose died in 1888, and Leake remarried shortly after to a woman 40 years his junior.

He retired in 1891, and died four years later. His estate went to his second wife. His childless brother's estate was inherited by Luke's widow, Lady Leake, when Sir Luke died in 1886. Lady Leake later married a Dr Whaler and returned to England.

See also
 Leake family tree

References

Further reading
 

1825 births
1895 deaths
Attorneys-General of Western Australia
Settlers of Western Australia
Members of the Western Australian Legislative Council
Australian people of English descent
19th-century Australian politicians